Michaël Van Geele (born 1 August 1986) is a Belgian professional footballer who currently plays as a midfielder for Belgian side KSV Bornem. He formerly played for Union Saint-Gilloise, Verbroedering Geel, Waasland-Beveren, FC Brussels, Royal Antwerp and FC Eindhoven.

External links
 Voetbal International profile 

1986 births
Living people
Belgian footballers
S.K. Beveren players
R.W.D.M. Brussels F.C. players
Royal Antwerp F.C. players
FC Eindhoven players
Eerste Divisie players
Footballers from Brussels
Royale Union Saint-Gilloise players

Association football midfielders